Thomas Baldwin may refer to:

Sports
 Tab Baldwin (born 1958), Lebanon national basketball team coach
 Tom Baldwin (racing driver) (1947–2004), NASCAR Modified driver
 Tom Baldwin (American football) (1961–2000), former American football defensive lineman
 Tommy Baldwin (born 1945), British football player
 Tommy Baldwin Jr. (born 1966), NASCAR crew chief, son of NASCAR driver Tom Baldwin

Characters
 Tom Baldwin (The 4400), the lead character of The 4400 television series
 Tom Baldwin (General Hospital), a character on soap opera General Hospital

Others
 Thomas Baldwin (comptroller) (1568–1641), British architect and Comptroller of the King's Works
 Thomas Baldwin (architect) ( 1750–1820), British architect, City Architect and Surveyor in Bath, Somerset
 Thomas Scott Baldwin (1854–1923), U.S. Army Major and pioneer balloonist
 Thomas Baldwin (philosopher) (born 1947), British philosopher
 Tom Baldwin (trader) (born 1956), bond trader investor and founder of the Baldwin Group of companies
 Tom Baldwin (journalist) (fl. 2010–2019), British journalist, Labour Party senior adviser and author